Ludwig van Beethoven's Bagatelles, Op. 126 for solo piano were published late in his career, in the year 1825. Beethoven dedicated them to his brother Nikolaus Johann van Beethoven (1776–1848), and wrote to his publisher, Schott Music, that the Opus 126 Bagatelles "are probably the best I've written".

Form

A bagatelle, in Beethoven's usage, is a kind of brief character piece.
The set comprises six short works, as follows:

Andante con moto, Cantabile e compiacevole, G major, 
Allegro, G minor, 
Andante, Cantabile e grazioso, E major, 
Presto, B minor, 
Quasi allegretto, G major, 
Presto, cut time then Andante amabile e con moto, E major, 

In prefatory remarks to his edition of the works, Otto von Irmer notes that Beethoven intended the six bagatelles be played in order as a single work, at least insofar as this can be inferred from a marginal annotation Beethoven made in the manuscript:  "Ciclus von Kleinigkeiten" (cycle of little pieces).  Lewis Lockwood suggests another reason to regard the work as a unity rather than a collection: starting with the second Bagatelle, the keys of the pieces fall in a regular succession of descending major thirds, a pattern Lockwood also notices in Beethoven's "Eroica" Symphony and the String Quartet, Op. 127.

Analysis

Maurice J. E. Brown, writing in the Grove Dictionary, says of the Bagatelles that they "are thoroughly typical of their composer and show affinities with the greater instrumental works written at the same time." Some possible such affinities are as follows: No. 1 shares the terse, elliptical expression of the first movement of the Piano Sonata, Op. 101; No. 3 shares the style of elaborate, high-register elaboration of a slow melody in triple time, seen in the slow movement of the Hammerklavier Sonata; and the final Bagatelle opens with a chaotic passage reminiscent of the opening of the finale of the Ninth Symphony.

See also
Bagatelles, Op. 33
Bagatelles, Op. 119

Notes

References

B. Levy, David "Notes", second series, vol.44, no. 3 (March,1988) pp. 555-557.
Grove Dictionary of Music and Musicians, online edition, article "Bagatelle".  The article is by Maurice J. E. Brown.  Copyright 2008, Oxford University Press.
Lockwood, Lewis (2005) Beethoven:  The Music and the Life.  W. W. Norton.
von Irmer, Otto (1975) (ed.) Beethoven:  Klavierstücke.  G. Henle Verlag, Munich.

External links 
 
A visual analysis of the Bagatelles 

Piano solos by Ludwig van Beethoven
1823 compositions